Badgeville, Inc. was a privately held technology company founded in 2010 with headquarters in Redwood City, California, and an additional office in New York. The firm provided software as a service (SaaS) for web sites to measure and influence user behaviour using techniques such as gamification.

Badgeville technology was acquired by CallidusCloud in 2016, which was in turn acquired by SAP in 2018.

History 
The company was founded by Kris Duggan and Wedge Martin, and launched at TechCrunch Disrupt on September 27, 2010 . At that time, the company had raised less than $300k in angel funding.

In November 2010, the firm raised a $2.5M Series A round led by El Dorado Ventures and Trinity Ventures. Badgeville subsequently raised a $12M Series B Round in July 2011, led by Norwest Venture Partners and El Dorado Ventures.

In November 2011, Badgeville unveiled the Behavior Platform for Enterprise. They expanded their business beyond gamification to include enterprise employee management and community reputation systems.

Social Fabric
Social Fabric was a service launched by Badgeville in September 2011. It is designed to increase user engagement and loyalty. It was offered to clients as a SaaS to allow websites to include social networking elements. Social Fabric offers activity stream based on an algorithm that contextualizes it to the user's activities, interests, and friends. Social Fabric also provides notifications and alerts.

References

Further reading
 
 Mangalindan, JP (2011-07-13). "Startup Idols one year later: Badgeville gets funded". Fortune. Retrieved 2011-08-26.
 Arrington, M (2011-07-12). "Badgeville Raises $12 Million, Celebrates With An Infographic". TechCrunch. Retrieved 2011-08-26.
 Harris, R (2011-06-02). "Badgeville launches Dynamic Game Engine and Widget Studio". ZDNet. Retrieved 2011-08-26.

External links 
 
 Badgeville Social Fabric

Gaming organizations
Defunct technology companies of the United States
2010 establishments in California
Gamification
2016 mergers and acquisitions
2016 disestablishments in California